Home field was Pierce field East Providence RI

Rhode Island Oceaneers was a soccer team.

History
The original Rhode Island Oceaneers soccer team was established in 1974. That season, they won the league title after a 16-2 regular season. U.S. Soccer Hall of Fame (1990) coach Manny Schellscheidt was named ASL Coach of the Year as the club outscored opponents 56-16.

For the 1977 season, the team was renamed the New England Oceaneers. Schellscheidt moved on to coach the New Jersey Americans, replaced by Massachusetts Hall of Famer (1999) John Bertos. After an 8-2-14  (8th of 9 teams) season, the team moved to Indianapolis, Indiana and became the Indianapolis Daredevils before folding after the 1979 season.

The original Oceaneers team played at Pierce Memorial Stadium in  East Providence, Rhode Island as a member of the second version of the American Soccer League from 1974-77.

Year-by-year

Coaches
 Manny Schellscheidt: 1974
 John Bertos: 1977

Honors
League Championship
 Winner (1): 1974

ASL Rookie of the Year
 1976:  John Roeslein

ASL Leading Goalkeeper
 1975:  Brad Steurer

ASL Coach of the Year
 1974:  Manny Schellscheidt

Notable players
 Mohammad Attiah
 Tony DiCicco
 Arnie Mausser
  Jose Franca Neto
 Eusebio

References

Soccer clubs in Rhode Island
American Soccer League (1933–1983) teams
1974 establishments in Rhode Island
American Soccer League (2014–2017) teams
Association football clubs established in 1974